Gijsen is a Dutch patronymic surname meaning "Gijs' son". Among variant forms are Geijssen, Geysen, Ghijsen, Giesen, and Gijzen. Notable people with the surname include:

Joannes Gijsen (1932–2013), Dutch Roman Catholic bishop
Marnix Gijsen pseudonym of Jan-Albert baron Goris (1899–1984), Belgian writer
Wim Gijsen (1933–1990), Dutch science fiction and fantasy writer
Variants:
Geurt Gijssen (born 1934), Dutch chess referee
Dyon Gijzen (born 1994), Dutch football striker
Pieter Gijzen / Peter Gysen, alternative names of Peeter Gijsels (1621–1690), Flemish Baroque painter.

References

Dutch-language surnames
Patronymic surnames

de:Gijsen
nl:Gijsen